The Capousacataca River is a tributary of the Mégiscane River, flowing into the north-eastern part of Senneterre in La Vallée-de-l'Or Regional County Municipality (RCM), in the administrative region of Abitibi-Témiscamingue, in Quebec, Canada.

The course of the river successively crosses the townships of Charrette and Girouard.

The Capousacataca River runs entirely on forest land north-east of the La Vérendrye Wildlife Reserve and on the west side of Gouin Reservoir. Forestry is the main economic activity of this hydrographic slope; recreational tourism activities, second.
The surface of the river is usually frozen from the beginning of December to the end of April. The hydrographic slope of the Capousacataca River is served by the R0808 forest road that goes up this valley (first on the west side, then on the east side) to the south east of Charrette Lake, where the road is oriented towards the North -East.

Geography

Toponymy
The hydronym "Capousacataca River" is of Native origin of the Algonquin nation, meaning "where there is a lot of dry wood". This toponym is indicated on a cartographic document dated 1940.

The toponym "Capousacataca River" was formalized on December 5, 1968, at the Commission de toponymie du Québec.

See also

References

External links 

La Vallée-de-l’Or
Rivers of Abitibi-Témiscamingue
Nottaway River drainage basin
Jamésie